
Year 858 (DCCCLVIII) was a common year starting on Saturday (link will display the full calendar) of the Julian calendar.

Events 
 By place 

 Europe 
 Summer – King Louis the German, summoned by the disaffected Frankish nobles, invades the West Frankish Kingdom and secures Aquitaine for his nephew Pepin II ("the Younger"). King Charles the Bald flees to Burgundy; he is saved by the help of the bishops, and by the fidelity of the family of the Welfs, who are related to Judith (second wife of former emperor Louis the Pious).
 Viking raiders, led by Björn Ironside, set fire to the earliest church on the site of Chartres Cathedral. Charles the Bald pays him tribute (Danegeld) to save Verberie (Northern France).

 Britain 
 January 13 – King Æthelwulf of Wessex dies after an 18-year reign, and is succeeded by his eldest son Æthelbald. He marries his father's young widow Judith (daughter of Charles the Bald), and becomes sole ruler of Wessex. His brother, Æthelberht, is left to rule Kent and the south-east of England.
 February 13 – King Kenneth I (Cináed mac Ailpín), king of the Scots, dies after a 15-year reign in which he has been crowned at Scone, and united the various parts of Scotland with his native Dál Riata. His 46-year-old brother succeeds as Donald I, king of Alba.

 Asia 
 October 7 – Emperor Montoku dies after an 8-year reign. He is succeeded by his 8-year-old son Seiwa as the 56th emperor of Japan, with Fujiwara no Yoshifusa (Seiwa's grandfather) governing as regent and great minister of the Council of State.
 An enormous flood along the Grand Canal inundates thousands of acres of farmland and kills tens of thousands of people in the North China Plain.

 By topic 

 Religion 
 April 17 – Pope Benedict III dies after a 3-year reign, in which he has intervened in a political conflict between the sons of Emperor Lothair I. He is succeeded by Nicholas I, as the 105th pope of Rome.
 Synod of Quierzy: The bishops remain loyal to Charles the Bald during the invasion of his dominions by Louis the German. They address a conciliatory letter to Louis the German, which includes the False Decretals.
 October 23 – Ignatios I, patriarch of Constantinople, is imprisoned by orders of Emperor Michael III, and replaced by the layman Photius I.

Births 
 Al-Battani, Muslim astronomer and mathematician (d. 929)
 Cele Dabhaill mac Scannal, Irish abbot (d. 927)
 Gao Jixing, founder of Chinese Jingnan (d. 929)
 He Gui, general of Later Liang (d. 919)
 Lady Wu, wife of Qian Liu (d. 919)
 Liu Xun, general of Later Liang (d. 921)
 Mansur al-Hallaj, Persian mystic writer (d. 922) 
 Niftawayh, Muslim scholar and grammarian (d. 935)
 Richard, duke of Burgundy (approximate date)
 Rudaki, Persian poet (approximate date)
 Tian Jun, Chinese warlord (d. 903)
 Zhang Juhan, official of Later Liang (d. 928)

Deaths 
 January 13 – Æthelwulf, king of Wessex
 February 13 – Kenneth I, king of Scotland (b. 810)
 April 17 – Benedict III, pope of the Catholic Church

 Leuthard II, Frankish count (or 869)
 Li Shangyin, Chinese official and poet 
 Liu Zhuan, chancellor of the Tang Dynasty (b. 796)
 Theodosius, patriarch of the Church of the East
 Wei Mo, chancellor of the Tang Dynasty (b. 793)

References